Several ships have been named Princess of Wales, for  the Princess of Wales:

  was launched at Stockton. She made three voyages as an "Extra ship", i.e., under charter, for the British East India Company (EIC). On her return she became a West Indiaman. A privateer captured her in 1803 as she was coming back to England from Jamaica, but British privateers immediately recaptured her. She continued sailing to Jamaica though later, under a new owner, she traded more widely. She probably foundered in 1828, and is last listed in 1830.
  was launched at Broadstairs as a Margate hoy. She was rebuilt in 1815. She became a sloop, but was referred to as a cutter. She left on her first seal hunting voyage in 1820 and was wrecked in March 1821 at the Crozet Islands.
 HMHS Princess of Wales (1899), a hospital ship formerly the SS General Werder (1874), renamed SS Midnight Sun in 1893.

Ship names